Sefwi Wiawso is a town in the Sefwi-Wiawso Municipal District in the Western North Region of Ghana.  It doubles as the capital of Sefwi-Wiawso Municipal District and Western North Region.
Wiawso serves as the traditional seat for the Omanhene of Sefwi-Wiawso traditional area. The settlement of wiawso began on hilltop with Sefwi-Dwenase settlement occupying the lowlands.
Overtime, Wiawso and Sefwi-Dwenase have conurbated with almost all the financial institutions, governmental agency-offices, lorry terminals and the main market all located in Sefwi Dwenase.
Wiawso is known for producing timber, cocoa and cashew.

History
Just like any other township or village in Ghana that has a name, there is a special story and a history behind the name, Sefwi Wiawso. The lands on which Sefwi Wiawso is located in the moment was once a thicket of forest with abundance of game and fertile soil. Through hunting the people came to discover the potential of the lands that has now become the Wiawso township. Over time, the then farmers realized the fertility of the soil and took advantage of it by starting cocoa farms there. Amongst the early settlers were the family of the then king, Nana Kwasipanin Bumankama and his wife Kooko Adwoa.

The first woman of the land was believed to have established a groundnut farm on top of the hill so they received much sunlight in most times of the day. She(the first lady) later named the place of her groundnut farm “Eyia wo so” which literally meant there is abundance of sunlight here. This place is what has now become known as Sefwi Wiawso as the people came to build their homes there.
It is believed that Nana Kwasipanin Bumankama came to kill an elephant at where Sefwi Wiawso highlands and raised a high platform for preparing and drying the game. The king later come to realize that the highlands is very suitable place for settlements and vey strategic in view of the rampant battles during those times. That would help them see oncoming enemies in the lowlands.

The people therefore moved and made their new settlement at the Sefwi Wiawso highlands under Nana Bumankama, the sixth king of the Sefwi area. This is the settlement that has developed to become Sefwi Wiawso of today, a land with people especially with passion for Agriculture.

Jewish community
Sefwi Wiawso is home to a Jewish community known as the House of Israel. The community maintains the Sefwi Wiaso Synagogue.

Economy
Agriculture is the major economic activity in Wiawso, thus in terms of 
employment and income generation, with about 80% of the working population 
engaged in this sector which constitutes the main source of household income. There are three prominent types of farming activities in this area are livestock farming, food and cash crop farming. The most 
predominant amongst these cash crop productions is cocoa which constitute a 
greater percentage of the farmers in Wiawso and surrounding communities.

Education
Prominent among the educational institutions in Wiawso are Wiawso College of Education,   Sefwi Wiawso Senior High School, Sefwi Wiawso Senior High Technical School and Sefwi Wiawso Nursing & Midwifery Training College (NMTCSW).

Tourism

The Tree of God (Nyame Dua)
The tree of God is located at Nyamebekyere, a distance of about 5 km from Sefwi Wiawso. It 
is said that about 150 years ago, a farmer struck a machete into the stump of the tree and this 
is still visible in the trunk of the tree. The tree has continuously been growing ever since, and 
today the trunk of the tree completely surrounds the machete.

Abombirim sacred tortoise forest 
It is a sacred forest preserve in which a giant tortoise lives. When one sees the tortoise and 
picks it, there turn to be total darkness in the forest. Until such a time that the tortoise is left 
for light to re-appear, one will not be able to find a way out of the forest. It is located at Sefwi 
Boako, a 21 km distance from Sefwi Wiawso.

Ancestral hole
The ancestral hole is at Sefwi Bosomoiso, about 4 km from Sefwi Wiawso, the capital. It is 
believed that the royal family of Bosomoiso community originated from this hole. It is 
believed to be a bottomless hole surrounded by trees but no leaves fall into it. The hole is 
alleged to have healing powers (Western region: Human development report 2013 by 
UNDP).

Festival
The chiefs and people of Sefwi-Wiawso traditional area cerebrate the Alluolue Festival(Yam, Eluo).
This festival is celebrated to mark an event that took place in the past. The festival is claimed to bring together people for the planning of development and sew bonds of unity and friendship.
During the festival, visitors are welcomed to share food and drinks. The people put on traditional clothes and there is durbar of chiefs. There is also dancing and drumming.

References

Jewish communities
House of Israel (Ghana)
Populated places in the Western North Region
Sefwi people